Daniel Wirth-Sand (7 December 1815 – 3 October 1901) was a Swiss politician and businessman. He presided the Swiss National Council in 1872/1873.

Further reading

External links 
 
 
 Wirth-Sand in Röll, Freiherr von: Enzyklopädie des Eisenbahnwesens, Band 10. Berlin, Wien 1923, S. 415.

Members of the National Council (Switzerland)
Presidents of the National Council (Switzerland)
1815 births
1901 deaths